Line 13 of the Guangzhou Metro is a rapid transit rail line currently in operation as of 28 December 2017 in Guangzhou, China. It is envisioned to be the "East West express line" complementing Line 3 which is the "North South express line". The line serves some of the most popular areas in Guangzhou such as Luochongwai Bus Terminal, Zhujiang New Town CBD and Yuancun while passing through some of the densest and most populated areas of Tianhe, Yuexiu, and Liwan Districts. Due to the density of the areas served, demand for this line is expected to be high, with an average mature daily ridership predicted at 1.44 million passengers per day when both phases are complete. Knowing this, engineers designed Line 13 to use 8 car wide body Type A rolling stock, the highest capacity rolling stock in the Guangzhou Metro to date. Phase 2 of the line, from Yuzhu to Chaoyang, is currently under construction and is scheduled to open in stages from 2023/24.

History

Planning 
During initial planning, Line 13 considered the use of 4 car L-type light metro trains for operation. However, severe congestion issues appeared just after the opening of Line 3, which only uses low capacity 3 car Type B trains and Line 6 which uses even lower capacity 4 car Type L light metro trains, prompted heavy public criticism. Planners subsequently reevaluated the passenger flow forecasts for the entire line of Line 13, and upgraded the design to directly use the highest capacity 8 car A-type trains.

During 2012, it has also considered the split of the second phase of Line 13 between Tianhe Park and Tangxia, so that Line 13 can be operated in segments with two stations as the terminal and transfer station, passengers would transfer between the two lines using a paired cross-platform interchange. At that time the predicted maximum passenger demand section of Line 13 was predicted to reach up to 55,000 pphpd heading eastbound beyond Tianhe Park station in the AM peak period. It was surmised that doubling up the line in that section will allow for additional capacity. However, this plan was ultimately never adopted.

In 2017, the second phase of the project (including the first phase of extension) was approved by the National Development and Reform Commission. On October 15, the Guangzhou Development and Reform Commission officially approved the feasibility study report of the second phase of Line 13. Initial ridership of Line 13 upon the opening of both phases is expected to reach 1.2 million passengers per day.

Stations

Phase II

 Under Construction

References

13
Railway lines opened in 2017